The 2022 Philadelphia Union II season is the club's sixth competitive season and first season competing in the inaugural MLS Next Pro. Union II competes in the MLS Next Pro's Eastern Conference. The team is managed by Marlon LeBlanc, his first competitive season with the club.

Background
After taking a competitive hiatus during the 2021 season, by December 2021 Union II was announced as one of the founding clubs of MLS Next Pro. Marlon LeBlanc, who was appointed head coach of Union II in March 2021, would now have his first competitive season with the team. In April 2022, Jose Kleberson was announced as an assistant coach under LeBlanc, after several years coaching in the Union's youth academy system.

Union II's roster construction began with their inaugural signing, Nelson Pierre from the Union academy system. Largely supplemented with first team and academy players, the front office made a marquee signing with José Riasco, paying a reported transfer fee over $1 million.

2022 Roster

Transfers

In

Competitions
Eastern Conference

Overall table

Results summary

Match results

Statistics

References

Philadelphia Union II
Philadelphia Union II
Philadelphia Union II